Kosec could refer to:

Koseč, a small settlement in Slovenia
Jason Kosec, a professional Canadian football linebacker